Annika Zimmermann (born 29 March 1989 in Darmstadt) is a German television personality and journalist.

Life 
Zimmermann was born on 29 March 1989 in Darmstadt, Hesse, Germany. She completed her Abitur at the Schuldorf-Gymnasium in Seeheim-Jugenheim in 2008. Afterwards, she took part in a Voluntary Ecological Year (FÖJ) at the Wadden Sea Conservation Station, where she carried out public relations work in the tourist industry on the island of Föhr.

Zimmermann studied applied media management at the Academy of German Media in Munich from 2009 to 2012, with a focus on sports journalism. She graduated with a Bachelor of Arts. As of the second semester, she also worked as a freelancer in the sports department of SPORT1. This was followed by activity as a moderator, reporter and editor at the online portal Spox.com, from 2013 to 2014. For this she was asked during the 2014 World Cup, among others, the Germany national football team.

Zimmermann has worked for ZDF since 15 September 2014, replacing Jessy Wellmer as sports reporter. In 2015 she was awarded the German Sports Journalist Award for Best Newcomer.

In addition to moderation and editorial Zimmermann is also used as a reporter at ZDF. She reported on the Olympic Games in Rio de Janeiro, the European Football Championship in France, the Ironman Triathlon World Cup in Hawaii, the Tour de France or the World Cup in Russia.

In the spring of 2018, her book Fit and Cheerful was published by Droemer Knaur. Together with co-author and sports scientist Timo Kirchenberger, Zimmermann wrote a guide on fitness, nutrition and mindfulness in everyday life.

Personal life 
Zimmermann lives in Berlin. In addition to her work in television, she holds readings and moderates events. In her spare time, she regularly does sports, especially running, cycling, crossfit and yoga.

References

External links 

 
 Biography at ZDF-Presseportal

1989 births
Living people
German women journalists
German television presenters
German women television presenters
German sports broadcasters
German sports journalists
Mass media people from Darmstadt
21st-century German journalists
ZDF people
21st-century German women